The Dark Tower is a 1946 BBC Home Service radio play written, in verse, and produced by Louis MacNeice, with music composed for it by Benjamin Britten. Dramatist and author Robin Brooks, writing in The Guardian in 2017, called it "a landmark in radio drama".

MacNeice wrote the play in the autumn of 1945. At the time, he was still badly shaken by the wartime death of a schoolfriend, Graham Shepard, and had what might be termed survivor guilt. Britten had previously written the music for MacNeice's The Agamemnon of Aeschylus (1936), and Out of the Picture (1937). MacNeice asked Britten to write music for The Dark Tower "with the greatest economy".

The play was first broadcast on 21 January 1946, a Monday, at 9:15pm. It was introduced as "a parable play on the ancient theme of the Quest, suggested by Robert Browning's poem Childe Roland to the Dark Tower Came". The cast included Cyril Cusack as Roland and Olga Lindo as The Mother. The "ad hoc" orchestra was conducted by Walter Goehr, conductor of the BBC Theatre Orchestra.

The play was published by Faber and Faber as The Dark Tower and Other Radio Scripts (1947). MacNeice dedicated the published script to Britten.

As part of MacNeice's centenary year (2007), Roma Tomelty and Centre Stage Theatre Company, based in Belfast, Northern Ireland, presented the radio play with an original score composed and performed by Mark McGrath. 

Robin Brooks produced a recreation of the first broadcast performance, with the BBC Concert Orchestra, at Orford Church, Suffolk, as part of the 2017 Britten Weekend. The performance was itself broadcast on BBC Radio 3.

The audio recording of the original 1946 broadcast is available to stream and is the oldest complete programme made available by the BBC, online. It has a running time of 1 hour, 13 minutes.

Notes

References

External links 

 Online recording

BBC Radio dramas
1946 plays
1946 in radio
Benjamin Britten
BBC Home Service programmes